Volney is an unincorporated community in Allamakee County, Iowa, United States.

History
 Volney was platted in 1856. By the 1870s, Volney contained gristmills, a sawmill, and a cooperage business. Volney's population was 60 in 1902, and 99 in 1925.

Notable people
Frank M. Byrne, Governor of South Dakota
Coe I. Crawford, Governor of South Dakota

References

Unincorporated communities in Allamakee County, Iowa
Unincorporated communities in Iowa
1856 establishments in Iowa
Populated places established in 1856